John Woods,  (1761, Bedford, Pennsylvania – December 16, 1816, Brunswick County, Virginia) was a Pennsylvania politician who served in the Pennsylvania State Senate and in the United States House of Representatives.

He was the son of Colonel George and Jane McDowell. John was  instructed by his father on land surveying. John, his father and his brother George, Jr  performed the original survey of Pittsburgh. On 30 Sep 1784, the laying out of the "Town of Pittsburgh" was completed by Thomas Vickroy and John Woods and approved by the attorney (Tench Francis) of the Penns (John & John Penn, Jr.) in Philadelphia. The survey established the future boundaries of Pittsburgh including a tract called "John Woods Plan". John married Theodosius Higbee in about 1780.  The two settled in Bedford, briefly, soon after. John's brother Henry Woods was also a U.S. Representative from Pennsylvania.

History

Woods studied law and gained admission to the bar in 1781. He also was a major in the militia and moved to Washington county the same year. In 1784, he joined the Westmoreland and Fayette County bars; He then joined the Allegheny County bar in 1788 and the Bedford bar in 1791.  His career was considered successful at the time due to ties to other prominent families in the area. His sister Jane married David Espy and his sister Anne married prominent James Ross, a Pittsburgh attorney. While working David Espy, the collaborative work of the two was described as a powerful influence in Western Pennsylvania at the time.  With Hugh Brackentidge and Alexander Addison, Woods was controlled legal system in Pittsburgh from 1788 until the mid-1790s. Woods was the attorney representing Pressley Neville who had lost his home during the Whiskey Rebellion. He was lottery manager helping to found the Pittsburgh Academy in 1796. His political career included serving as a presidential elector and caucus nominee for Congress in 1798.

He was elected as a Federalist to the Fourteenth Congress, taking office on March 4, 1815. The term was set to run until March 3, 1817, but Woods never appeared in Congress due to poor health. Woods was on his way back from South Carolina to recuperate when he died at the age of 55, only two years into his term.

See also
List of United States Congress members who died in office (1790–1899)

References

 John Woods - Pennsylvania State Senate

1761 births
1816 deaths
People from Bedford, Pennsylvania
Pennsylvania state senators
Pennsylvania lawyers
People from Fayette County, Pennsylvania
Politicians from Pittsburgh
People from Westmoreland County, Pennsylvania
Federalist Party members of the United States House of Representatives from Pennsylvania
19th-century American lawyers